This is a List of natural monuments of Georgia. As of January 1, 2020, there are 40 Natural Monuments comprising caves, landforms, waterfalls and remarkable old trees. Total number of protected areas in Georgia — 89.  Management and coordination of the Protected Areas is implemented by a Legal Entity of Public Law Protected Areas Agency of the Ministry of Environment Protection and Natural Resources of Georgia.

References

Natural monuments